Pony Soldier is a 1952 American Northern Western film set in Canada, but filmed in Sedona, Arizona. It is based on a 1951 Saturday Evening Post story "Mounted Patrol" by Garnett Weston. It was retitled MacDonald of the Canadian Mounties in Britain and The Last Arrow in France, Spain, and Italy.

Plot
In 1876, the North-West Mounted Police send Constable Duncan MacDonald (Tyrone Power) and a blackmailed Blackfoot scout (Thomas Gomez) to get the Cree to sign Treaty 6 with the Crown. Initially hostile, the Cree are influenced by a Fata Morgana-type mirage that they mistake for the power of Queen Victoria.

In addition to negotiating with the Cree, MacDonald of the Mounted Police rescues White hostages (Robert Horton and Penny Edwards), arrests a murderer, and adopts a Cree son (Anthony Earl Numkena).

Cast
 Tyrone Power as Constable Duncan MacDonald
 Cameron Mitchell as Konah
 Thomas Gomez as Natayo Smith
 Penny Edwards as Emerald Neeley
 Robert Horton as Jess Calhoun
 Anthony Earl Numkena as Comes Running
 Adeline DeWalt Reynolds as White Moon 
 Howard Petrie as Inspector Frazer 
 Stuart Randall as Standing Bear 
Included in the cast were Richard Boone and Frank deKova, with ending narration by Michael Rennie. Golden Globe-winning actor Earl Holliman made his film debut in this playing an uncredited role.

Production
Director Newman originally scouted locations in Montana, but finding nothing he thought suitable, the film was made in Sedona, Arizona.  During development of the project, technical advisor on Native American issues, Nipo T. Strongheart, wrote a critical review of the proposed screenplay, though other departments of the studio had begun work on it. This led to a meeting with studio executives, which he described as feeling like he was called to the principal's office, and led to a major reconstruction of the whole project. Strongheart worked with the Cree people and their language, and coached non-Indian and Indian actors throughout the movie. During the filming at Sedona, production was interrupted by snowstorms and the flash of a nuclear weapon tested 300 miles away in Nevada. The producers recruited 450 Navajo to play Cree when large numbers were needed. Strongheart, who also plays a medicine man in the film, also toured to promote the movie. Strongheart had appeared in the 1925 film Braveheart with Tyrone Power Sr.

References

External links

 
 
 
Filming at Sedona
The New York Times review

1952 films
American Western (genre) films
1950s English-language films
20th Century Fox films
Films scored by Alex North
Films set in the Canadian Prairies
Films shot in Arizona
1952 Western (genre) films
American films based on actual events
Films based on short fiction
Royal Canadian Mounted Police in fiction
Northern (genre) films
Films directed by Joseph M. Newman
1950s American films